Joe Turner May (born June 8, 1937) is an American businessman, electrical engineer, inventor, aviator, and politician.

Biography
Born on June 8, 1937 in Broadway, Virginia, May graduated from Virginia Tech in 1959. Between 1955–1958, he served in the United States Army.

In 1977, May founded EIT, a Sterling-based electronics manufacturer. May holds over twenty patents in the fields of electrical and electronic engineering. He is also an avid aviator, holding licenses in both fixed and rotary wing aircraft.

Between 1994 and 2014, he served in the Virginia House of Delegates, representing the 33rd district. The district included parts of Clarke, Frederick and Loudoun counties. May, a self described moderate, was a member of the Republican Party caucus. During his time in the House of Delegates, May was co-chair of the Science and Technology committee between 1998–2001, and chair between 2002–2007. 

In June 2013, Dave LaRock defeated May in the 33rd district Republican primary.

In December 2013, May announced his candidacy in a special election to succeed Democratic Attorney General-elect Mark Herring, in the Virginia State Senate. After the Republican Party decided to choose its candidate through a "mass meeting" instead of a primary, May declared he would run as an independent. May was endorsed by both the conservative-leaning National Federation of Independent Business and the centralist Independent Greens Party. On election day, May garnered 10% of the vote, while the Democratic and Republican candidates received 53% and 38%, respectively.

May was the Republican candidate in the January 8, 2019, special election for the 33rd district to the Virginia Senate, losing to Democrat Jennifer Boysko, following Jennifer Wexton's election to the U.S. House of Representatives.

May and his wife, Roberta Compton Downs, reside in Leesburg, Virginia. They have two daughters, Susan May and Elaine May Attridge, a son Philip May (deceased), and three grandchildren.

Electoral history

References

External links
 (campaign finance)

1937 births
Living people
Republican Party members of the Virginia House of Delegates
Virginia Tech alumni
American electrical engineers
20th-century American inventors
Helicopter pilots
People from Leesburg, Virginia
21st-century American politicians
People from Broadway, Virginia
Engineers from Virginia